Seminaphtharhodafluor or SNARF is a fluorescent dye that changes color with pH.
It can be used to construct optical biosensors that use enzymes that change pH.

The absorption peak of the derivative carboxy-SNARF at pH 6.0 is at wavelength (515 and) 550 nm, while that at pH 9.0 is at 575 nm.

The emission peak of carboxy-SNARF at pH 6.0 is at wavelength 585 nm, while that at pH 9.0 is at 640 nm.

SNARF-1 can serve as a substrate for the MRP1 (multidrug resistance-associated protein-1) drug transporter, to measure the activity of the MRP1 transporter. For this purpose, an acetomethoxyester group is added to SNARF-1. Cellular esterases cleave off SNARF-1, and its transport out of the cells can be measured by following the loss of fluorescence from the cells.

References

Fluorone dyes
Spiro compounds
Lactones